Ascalenia synclina is a moth in the family Cosmopterigidae. It was described by Edward Meyrick in 1908. It is found in India and on Java in Indonesia.

References

Moths described in 1908
Ascalenia
Moths of Asia
Moths of Indonesia